Cahul International Airport  is located in southern part of Moldova, 8 km (5.0 mi) south-east of Cahul.

See also

Moldovan ICAO Airport Codes
List of airports in Moldova
Civil Aviation Administration of Moldova

References

External links
 Civil Aviation Administration of Moldova

Airports in Moldova
Airports built in the Soviet Union
Airport